{{DISPLAYTITLE:C13H16N2O3}}
The molecular formula C13H16N2O3 (molar mass: 248.28 g/mol, exact mass: 248.1161 u) may refer to:

 6-Hydroxymelatonin (6-OHM)
 Indorenate